The Janicke House is a historic house on Goshen Center Road in Goshen, New Hampshire.  Built about 1830, it is one of a regionally distinctive cluster of plank-frame houses built in the 19th century.  The house was listed on the National Register of Historic Places in 1985.

Description and history
It is set on a rise close to the road, from which it is separated by a fieldstone wall. It is a -story wooden structure, with a gabled roof and clapboarded exterior. The remaining walls were built using balloon framing, as part of a later expansion of the structure.

This house was built about 1830, and is one of three such houses to survive on Goshen Center Road.  It is also one of the older such houses in Goshen, and may have served as an example for building John Chandler, a major local builder of plank-frame houses in the mid-19th century.  There were originally as many as six plank-frame houses in the immediate area, of which three were destroyed by a major fire in the 1940s.

See also
National Register of Historic Places listings in Sullivan County, New Hampshire

References

Vernacular architecture in the United States
Houses on the National Register of Historic Places in New Hampshire
Houses completed in 1830
Houses in Goshen, New Hampshire
1830 establishments in New Hampshire
National Register of Historic Places in Sullivan County, New Hampshire